The Block Brochure: Welcome to the Soil 1 is the fifteenth studio album by American rapper E-40. The album is part of a trilogy that was released on March 26, 2012. The other albums in the trilogy include The Block Brochure: Welcome to the Soil 2, and The Block Brochure: Welcome to the Soil 3. E-40's last four albums were released in pairs; Revenue Retrievin': Day Shift and Revenue Retrievin': Night Shift were released in 2010, and Revenue Retrievin': Overtime Shift and Revenue Retrievin': Graveyard Shift were released in 2011.

The album has 18 tracks, along with 2 bonus tracks, and it features Juicy J, 2 Chainz, B-Legit, Richie Rich, Gangsta Boo, Droop-E, The Jacka, Raheem DeVaughn, Mugzi, Turf Talk, and Mistah F.A.B., and Go Hard Black among others.

A behind the scenes for the music video for "They Point" featuring Juicy J and 2 Chainz and produced by Bangladesh was released on February 16, 2012, and the video was released on March 22. The music video for "Fast Lane" was released on the album's release date. On August 1, the video for "Turn It Up" was released. Despite not being released as a single, "In This Thang Breh" featuring Turf Talk and Mistah F.A.B. peaked at #19 on the Bubbling Under R&B/Hip-Hop Songs chart, making it Turf Talk's first and only charting song.

Two commercials were released in March 2012 to promote the Block Brochure album series. The first volume scored a 78/100 on Metacritic, indicating "generally positive reviews". It is the highest of the three volumes. The volume debuted at #59 on the Billboard 200, and at #10 on the Hot R&B/Hip-hop albums chart.

Track listing

Notes
 Stressmatic is not credited on "Rock Stars" and "Cutlass"
 Cousin Fik, Christian Real Keez and Droop-E are not credited on the iTunes version of "Mary Jane"
 "Bust Moves" heavily samples "Going Back to Cali" by the Notorious B.I.G.

Charts

References 

E-40 albums
2012 albums
Albums produced by Bangladesh (record producer)
Albums produced by Rick Rock
Albums produced by JellyRoll
Albums produced by Droop-E
Albums produced by Bosko
EMI Records albums